Bello may refer to:

People
Bello (surname), multiple people
Bello Nock, (born 1968), American circus clown often known simply as Bello
Domingo Bello y Espinosa (1817–1884), Spanish lawyer and botanist, cited simply as Bello in botanical names
Bello of Carcassonne (died 812), nobleman in Cité de Carcassonne
Atlético Bello, a former Colombian football (soccer) team

Places
Bello (Aller), Asturias, Spain
Bello, Antioquia, Colombia
Bello, Aragon, Spain
Bello, Sujawal , Pakistan

Other uses
Bello, greeting of a Minion, from the Despicable Me franchise
Bello (crater), a crater on the planet Mercury
Bello orthography, a Spanish language orthography developed by Andrés Bello and Juan Garcia del Río
Doctor Bello, a 2013 Nigerian film

See also

Bellos
Bellow (disambiguation)
Bellu (disambiguation)
Belo (disambiguation)
Monte Bello (disambiguation)
Montebello (disambiguation)
Portobello (disambiguation)